1E is a privately owned IT software and services company based in the United Kingdom. 1E is headquartered in London, with offices in Austin, Dublin, and Noida.

History
1E was founded in 1997 by three former Microsoft contractors, Sumir Karayi, Phil Wilcock, and Mark Blackburn, who each contributed £500 to start the company. Karayi was the CEO from 1997 to 2021, succeeded by current CEO Mark Banfield. Blackburn is the CIO, whilst Wilcock has left the company. The company has more than 30 million licenses deployed worldwide, across 1,700 organizations from public and private sectors in 42 countries.[citation needed]

The company's name is derived from a computer error. When some Microsoft Windows computers crash, a blue screen containing "STOP 0x0000001E" appears. This name was chosen because the founders had the ambition that 1E could prevent this from happening to big companies.

Research
In 2009, 1E and the Alliance to Save Energy commissioned independent research into the awareness and behavior of PC users and server administrators in the world's largest companies.

In 2010, 1E commissioned Vanson Bourne to conduct research into Help Desk Efficiency. The resulting report highlighted a number of challenges for IT departments. More than a third of users perceive little or no value from the money their IT department spends on them each year. More than 50% of users have to chase every request they make at least once to make sure they receive the software they ask for and more than two-thirds (68%) of users feel it would be quicker and easier to find and install software themselves rather than contacting their IT help desk.

References

Software companies established in 1997
Software companies of the United Kingdom